Kim Ung-so (1564–1624) was a senior military officer in the Joseon dynasty. During the Imjin war, he was in charge of soldiers and horses in the Eastern Gyeongsang Province.

During this war, he was ordered to proceed north with his troops and fight the Jurchens instead of the Japanese. His army of 15,000 Koreans later joined the Chinese Commander Ma Gui and 24,000 Chinese soldiers in the Second Siege of Ulsan; the combined force failed to take the Japanese Castle.

The house where he was born in Okto-ri, Ryonggang County, Nampo is considered one of the National Treasures of North Korea.

See also 
 Kim Ung-so House

References 

People of the Japanese invasions of Korea (1592–1598)
1564 births
1624 deaths
17th-century executions by Korea
Gimhae Kim clan